Shoes For Industry: The Best of the Firesign Theatre is the eighteenth comedy album by the Firesign Theatre. Released in 1993  as a two-disk CD on Laugh.com, it is a compilation of tracks from the group's albums recorded during their Golden Age (1968–1975) for Columbia Records. It is an expanded version of the 1976 Columbia compilation LP Forward Into The Past, containing 31 tracks compared to the previous 18. Unlike that LP, it also contains some selections from two solo albums, Proctor and Bergman's TV or Not TV and Phil Austin's Roller Maidens From Outer Space. Its release was coordinated with Back From the Shadows: The Firesign Theatre's 25th Anniversary Reunion Tour.

Track listing
All tracks written by the Firesign Theatre.

Disc one

Disc two

External links
Homepage

References

1993 compilation albums
The Firesign Theatre albums
1990s comedy albums